The Two-man competition at the IBSF World Championships 2019 was held on March 1 and 2, 2019.

Results
The first two runs were started on March 1 at 17:04 and the last two runs on March 2 at 17:04.

References

Two-man